Georgy Stepanovich Nosar (aka Pyotr Alekseevich Khrustalev, pseudonym: Yuri Pereyaslavsky, 1877, Pereyaslav - 1919, ibid.) was a political and public figure, and assistant barrister from the Russian Empire. From October to November 1905, he was the first chairman of the St. Petersburg Council of Workers' Deputies. He was born in Pereyaslav, then in the Russian Empire. He died in the same city although by then the Russian Empire had collapsed.

References 

Assassinated Russian politicians
1877 births
People from Pereiaslav
1919 deaths
Lawyers from the Russian Empire
Russian Social Democratic Labour Party members
Pseudonymous writers
Syndicalists
Mensheviks
Jurists from the Russian Empire
Saint Petersburg State University alumni